DWAR is the callsign of the following radio stations in the Philippines:

 DWAR-AM, 819 kHz, in Ilocos Norte, by Nation Broadcasting Corporation
 DWAR-FM, 103.9 MHz, in Palawan, by Rolin Broadcasting